Michael Wilson (born September 15, 1959) is an American former basketball player. He played college basketball for Marquette University from 1978 to 1982. Wilson averaged 10.9 points, 3.8 assists, 3.5 rebounds and 2.3 steals over his 119-game college career. Wilson was captain of the Marquette team in 1980-81 and 1981–82 and he led the team in scoring his senior season  with 16.1 points per game.

Wilson played in the National Basketball Association. Wilson was drafted in the third round of the 1982 NBA draft by the Cleveland Cavaliers with the 47th overall pick  He first played with the Washington Bullets in 1983,  played with the Cavaliers in 1984. Later, he played with the New Jersey Nets in 1984-85,1986-1987  and the  Atlanta Hawks in 1986-1987.

Wilson also played 144 games in the Continental Basketball Association (CBA). He averaged 16.6 points and 3.8 assists per game over five seasons for the Wisconsin Flyers, Sarasota Stingers, Charleston Gunners, Topeka Sizzlers and Rochester Flyers from 1982 to 1988.

References

1959 births
Living people
African-American basketball players
American men's basketball players
Atlanta Hawks players
Basketball players from Memphis, Tennessee
Charleston Gunners players
Cleveland Cavaliers draft picks
Cleveland Cavaliers players
Marquette Golden Eagles men's basketball players
New Jersey Nets players
Point guards
Rochester Flyers players
Sarasota Stingers players
Shooting guards
Topeka Sizzlers players
Washington Bullets players
Wisconsin Flyers players
American expatriate basketball people in the Philippines
Great Taste Coffee Makers players
Philippine Basketball Association imports
21st-century African-American people
20th-century African-American sportspeople